Tiridates III (Armenian:  Գ Trdat III;  – c. 330), also known as Tiridates the Great ( Trdat Mets), or Tiridates IV, was the Armenian Arsacid king from c.298 to c. 330. 

In 301, Tiridates proclaimed Christianity as the state religion of Armenia, making the Armenian kingdom the first state to embrace Christianity officially.

Name 
The name of "Tiridates" is the Greek variant of the Parthian name Trdat, meaning "created by Tir." Although Tir does not appear in the Zoroastrian text of Avesta, he is a prominent yazata (angelic divinity) in the religion. The name also appears in other Greek variants, such as Terdates, Teridates, Teridatios, and Tiridatios. It appears in Syriac as Turadatis and in Latin as Tiridates.

Early childhood
Tiridates III was the son of Khosrov II of Armenia, the latter being assassinated in 252 by a Parthian agent named Anak under orders from Ardashir I. Tiridates had at least one sibling, a sister called Khosrovidukht and was the namesake of his paternal grandfather, Tiridates II of Armenia. Anak was captured and executed along with most of his family, while his son, Gregory the Illuminator, was sheltered in Caesaria, in Cappadocia. As the only surviving heir to the throne, Tiridates was quickly taken away to Rome soon after his father's assassination while still an infant. He was educated in Rome and was skilled in languages and military tactics; in addition he firmly understood and appreciated Roman law. The Armenian historian Movses Khorenatsi described him as a strong and brave warrior, who participated in combat against his enemies, and personally led his army to victory in many battles.

Kingship
In 270 the Roman emperor Aurelian engaged the Sassanids, who had now replaced the Parthians, on the eastern front and he was able to drive them back. Tiridates, as the true heir to the now Persian-occupied Armenian throne, came to Armenia and quickly raised an army and drove the enemy out in 298. When Tiridates returned to Armenia, he made the city of Vagharshapat his capital, as it had been the capital of his late father.

For a while, fortune appeared to favour Tiridates. He not only expelled his enemies, but he carried his arms into Assyria. At the time the Persian Empire was in a distracted state. The throne was disputed by the ambition of two contending brothers, Hormuz and Narses. The civil war was, however, soon terminated and Narses was universally acknowledged as King of Persia. Narses then directed his whole force against the foreign enemy. The contest then became too unequal. Tiridates once more took refuge with the Romans. The Roman-Armenian alliance grew stronger, especially while Diocletian ruled the empire. This can be attributed to the upbringing of Tiridates, the consistent Persian aggressions and the murder of his father by Anak. With Diocletian's help, Tiridates pushed the Persians out of Armenia. In 299, Diocletian left the Armenian state in a quasi-independent and protectorate status possibly to use it as a buffer in case of a Persian attack.

In 297, Tiridates married an Alani Princess called Ashkhen, by whom he had three children: a son called Khosrov III, a daughter called Salome, and another daughter who married St. Husik I, one of the earlier Catholicoi of the Armenian Apostolic Church.

Conversion

The traditional story of the conversion of the king and the nation is primarily based on the fifth-century work of Agathangelos titled "The History of the Armenians."  It tells of Gregory the Illuminator, the son of Anak, who was brought up as a Christian and, feeling guilt for his own father's sin, joined the Armenian army and worked as a secretary to the king. Christianity in Armenia had a strong footing by the end of the 3rd century, but the nation by and large still followed Zoroastrianism. Tiridates was no exception as he too worshiped various ancient gods. During a Zoroastrian religious ceremony Tiridates ordered Gregory to place a flower wreath at the foot of the statue of the goddess Anahit in Eriza. Gregory refused, proclaiming his Christian faith. This act infuriated the king. His fury was only exacerbated when several individuals declared that Gregory was in fact, the son of Anak, the traitor who had killed Tiridates's father. Gregory was tortured and finally thrown in Khor Virap, a deep underground dungeon.

During the years of Gregory's imprisonment, a group of virgin nuns, led by Gayane, came to Armenia as they fled the Roman persecution of their Christian faith. Tiridates heard about the group and the legendary beauty of one of its members, Rhipsime. He brought them to the palace and demanded to marry the beautiful virgin; she refused. The king had the whole group tortured and killed. After this event, he fell ill and according to legend, adopted the behavior of a wild boar, aimlessly wandering around in the forest. Khosrovidukht had a dream wherein Gregory was still alive in the dungeon, and he was the only one able to cure the king. At this point it had been 13 years since his imprisonment, and the odds of him being alive were slim. They retrieved him, and, despite being incredibly malnourished, he was still alive. He was kept alive by a kind-hearted woman who threw a loaf of bread down in Khor Virap every day for him.

Tiridates was brought to Gregory and was miraculously cured of his illness in 301. Persuaded by the power of the cure, the king immediately proclaimed Christianity the official state religion. Thus, Armenia became a nominally Christian kingdom and the first state to officially adopt Christianity. Tiridates appointed Gregory as Catholicos of the Armenian Apostolic Church.

While as a matter of fact the conversion to Christianity proved to be decisive and pivotal in Armenian history, it seems that the Christianisation of Armenia by the Arsacids of Armenia (Arshakuni) was partly in defiance of the Sassanids.<ref>{{cite book |quote="(..) - and there is no doubt that during the latter part of the Parthian period Armenia was a predominantly Zoroastrian adhering land. Thereafter, it embraced Christianity (partly, it seems, in defiance of the Sasanians)... (...)"|title=Zoroastrians: Their Religious Beliefs and Practices|first=Mary|last=Boyce |publisher=Psychology Press|year=2001 |pages=84 }}</ref>

Rest of reign
The switch from the traditional Zoroastrianism to Christianity was not an easy one. Tiridates often used force to impose this new faith upon the people and many armed conflicts ensued, due to Zoroastrianism being deeply rooted in the Armenian people. An actual battle took place between the king's forces and the Zoroastrian camp, resulting in the weakening of polytheistic military strength. Tiridates thus spent the rest of his life trying to eliminate all ancient beliefs and in doing so destroyed countless statues, temples and written documents. As a result, little is known from local sources about ancient Armenian history and culture. The king worked feverishly to spread the faith and died in 330. Movses Khorenatsi states that several members of the nakharar families conspired against Tiridates and eventually poisoned him.

Tiridates III, Ashkhen and Khosrovidukht are Saints in the Armenian Apostolic Church, and by extension all of the Oriental Orthodox Churches,  and their feast day is on the Saturday after the fifth Sunday after Pentecost. On this feast day To the Kings'' is sung. Their feast day is usually around June 30.

Burial site
Tiridates is said to be buried south of Mt. Sebuh (modern-day Kara Dağ) in a now ruined fortress eponymously called Drdadpert (locally known as Durnakale) located in the Kemah district of the Erzincan province. The fortress is near to the Saint Gregory the Illuminator Monastery (Surp Krikor Lusavorichi Vank and now locally known as Çankılvankı) and the Grotto of [Saint] Mane (Manéayr).

Gallery

References

Bibliography

See also
Armenian Apostolic Church
Arsacid dynasty of Armenia
Saint Gregory the Illuminator Cathedral, Yerevan

286 births
330 deaths
3rd-century kings of Armenia
4th-century kings of Armenia
Armenian saints
4th-century Christian saints
Roman Catholic royal saints
Armenian Apostolic Christians
Roman client kings of Armenia
Converts to Christianity from Zoroastrianism
3rd-century Christians
4th-century Christians
Arsacid kings of Armenia